The dukes of Naples were the military commanders of the ducatus Neapolitanus, a Byzantine outpost in Italy, one of the few remaining after the conquest of the Lombards. In 661, Emperor Constans II, highly interested in south Italian affairs (he established his court in Syracuse), appointed a Neapolitan named Basil dux or magister militum. Thereafter a line of dukes, often largely independent and dynastic from the mid-ninth century, ruled until the coming of the Normans, a new menace they could not weather. The thirty-ninth and last duke, Sergius VII, surrendered his city to King Roger II of Sicily in 1137.

Dukes appointed by Byzantium
 Gudeliscus, as duke of Campania (dux Campaniae)
 Guduin, first recorded duke of Naples
 seized by the rebel John of Conza
 Anatolius
661–666 Basil
666–670 Theophylactus I
670–673 Cosmas
673–677 Andrew I
677–684 Caesarius I
684–687 Stephen I
687–696 Bonellus
696–706 Theodosius
706–711 Caesarius II
711–719 John I
719–729 Theodore I
729–739 George
739–755 Gregory I
755–766 Stephen II
767–794 Gregory II
794–801 Theophylactus II
801– Anthimus
–821 Theoctistus
821 Theodore II
821–832 Stephen III
832–834 Bonus
834 Leo
834–840 Andrew II
840 Contardus

Hereditary dukes
These dukes were more independent than their predecessors and they were not chosen by the emperor, but the descendants of Sergius I, who was elected by the citizens.

Sergian dynasty (Sergii)
840–864/865 Sergius I
864/865–870 Gregory III
870–877/878 Sergius II
877/878–898 Athanasius
898– Gregory IV
–919 John II
919–928 Marinus I
928–968/969 John III
968/969–992/997 Marinus II
992–997/999 Sergius III
997/999–1005 John IV
1005–1038 Sergius IV, co-ruling with his son (below) after 1033
1027–1029 under control of Pandulf IV of Capua
1033–1050 John V, co-ruling with his father (above) before 1038 and with his son (below) after
1038–1076 Sergius V, co-ruling with his father (above) until 1050
1077–1107 Sergius VI, co-ruling with his son (below) after 1090
1090–1122 John VI, co-ruling with his father (above) until 1107
1122–1137 Sergius VII
1137–1139 vacant

In 1139, Naples capitulated to the Normans and shortly after elected a Norman ruler from the ruling dynasty.

House of Hauteville
1139–1144 Alfonso
1144–1154 William

In 1154, William succeeded to the Sicilian crown and the line of dukes ends.

Notes

External links
Naples in the Dark Ages by David Taylor and Jeff Matthews.

Further reading
Chalandon, Ferdinand. Histoire de la domination normande en Italie et en Sicile, 2 vol. Paris: 1907.
Norwich, John Julius. The Normans in the South 1016–1130. Longmans: London, 1967.
Norwich, John Julius. The Kingdom in the Sun 1130–1194. Longman: London, 1970.
Oman, Charles. The Dark Ages 476–918. Rivingtons: London, 1914.
Skinner, Patricia. Family Power in Southern Italy: The Duchy of Gaeta and its Neighbours, 850-1139. Cambridge: Cambridge University Press, 1995. .

Naples Dukes
 
Naples
Naples